Polk City may refer to a place in the United States:

 Polk City, Florida, a city
 Polk City, Iowa, a city